Hisss (also known as Nagin: The Snake Woman) is a 2010 adventure-horror film, directed by Jennifer Chambers Lynch. Indian actress Mallika Sherawat plays the leading role.

Plot

The story begins in Natchi, a small town in the Indian state of Kerala. George States (Jeff Doucette) is suffering from the last stage of brain cancer and has only six months to live. To prevent death and gain immortality, he decides to extract the "Nagmani" immortal blood from a nagin, a shape-shifting cobra that can change into a human. He and hired henchmen capture the nag (the male snake) so that the nagin (the female) comes after the capturer to free her mate, thus allowing him to obtain the nagmani by force. He keeps the nag in a glass box where he electrocutes and tortures him. His plan works and the nagin starts following them.

The nagin transforms into a beautiful woman (Mallika Sherawat), and is later helped by police inspector Vikram Gupta (Irrfan Khan) and his wife, Maya (Divya Dutta), who is infertile, causing a strain in their relationship. The nagin helps a few women who are helpless: One who is beaten mercilessly by her husband; one being raped by a man, and so on. She even helps herself when two men try to rape her. She turns into a giant cobra and brutally kills those two men, some of George States’ henchmen who were involved in the capture of her mate as well as men who torture women. She turns back into a human after her killings. Inspector Gupta tries to help the nagin find her mate, but at the same time, tries to investigate the murders, unaware she is responsible for them. Finally, the Nagin reaches George's hideout where she reclaims her mate and they have sex, leading her to becoming pregnant. George attempts to capture the nagin during intercourse since this is when she will be most vulnerable.

Wearing a suit that hides his heat signature, he lures her by using her dying mate as bait to a trap. He captures her and tries taking the nagmani, but at that moment, Inspector Gupta arrives and helps her. Angered by the death of her mate by the hands of George, the nagin turns into a half snake, half human hybrid creature and throws him in the glass box where her mate was kept and electrocutes him to death. She leaves the hideout, carrying her dead mate. Inspector Gupta is amazed at everything he has just witnessed. He returns to his wife Maya, who later gives birth to their baby, while the nagin, back in the form of a beautiful woman, watches over the nest of eggs she has laid, which hatch into numerous baby cobras.

Cast
 Mallika Sherawat as Nagin
 Irrfan Khan as Inspector Vikram Gupta
 Jeff Doucette as George States
 Divya Dutta as Maya Gupta, inspector's wife
 Sound Effects as Additional Characters
 All Actors as Additional Characters

Production
The film was shot simultaneously in English and Hindi. Famed special effects designer Robert Kurtzman was responsible for developing the look of the Snake Woman. Hisss was shot in the jungle of Kerala, India. It was also shot in Mumbai, Chennai, Madh Island, and in the studios of Filmistan.

The film is edited by American editor Tony Ciccone, who is also credited with additional sound design. His editing credit is misrepresented on preliminary on-line posters as "Anthony Ciccone."

Mooppan Raghavan, tribal leader of Thalikakal settlement in Kerala, and over a dozen members of his tribe were recruited as extras.

A documentary, titled Despite The Gods, about director Jennifer Lynch's struggle to make the film was released in 2012.

Release

Theatrical
At the Cannes Film Festival, Mallika Sherawat promoted Hisss by posing with a  Burmese python on the red carpet. The film was released in India on 22 October in Hindi, Tamil and Telugu. The Malayalam version was released on 12 November.

Premiere
The film was set to premiere at the Montreal Festival du Nouveau Cinéma on 14 October and at the Gotham Screen Film Festival & Screenplay Contest in New York on 15 October but was pulled from both festivals shortly before they opened.

Reception

Critical response

Hisss received highly negative reviews from critics upon release from both domestic and international critics. 

Nikhat Kazmi of Times of India gave it 2 out of 5 stars and stated, "A film like Hisss should have scored with its special effects. But once again, the carnage that the serpent unleashes is grotesque and her transformation from seductress to venomous reptile is more funny than eyeball-grabbing." Taran Adarsh from Bollywood Hungama gave it 1/2 star out of five and stated that "If there were Razzies in Bollywood, Hisss would win hands down. Films like Hisss make you realize what's going wrong in Bollywood today. On one hand, we celebrate the new stories being told in our films and on the other, we churn out a Hisss, which is badly scripted, poorly enacted and carelessly directed. Believe me, it's easy to solve the crossword puzzle in newspapers than it is to understand what exactly is going on in this film. As for director Jennifer Lynch, she needs a crash course in film-making pronto. The visual effects seem straight out of a B-grade Bollywood film. On the whole, Hisss is best avoided."

Rajeev Masand from CNN-IBN gave it 1 star out of five and stated that "In Hisss, directed by Jennifer Lynch, Mallika stars as a shape-shifting snake that has been separated from her reptile lover by a crazy foreigner who's seeking a naagmani that will cure his cancer. The outrageous plot involves this ichchadhari nagin emerging as something of a feminist superhero who comes to the rescue of various tormented women, even as she's seeking out her kidnapped partner. Irrfan Khan plays the cop investigating a series of mysterious killings, and Divya Dutta plays his wife. At 90 minutes, it's mercifully short, but watch it only if you're not easily disgusted."

Anupama Chopra from NDTV gave it 1/2 star out of five and stated that "Hisss has marginally better special effects and much more nudity but the script is so deliriously inept that, in comparison, the average Ramsay horror film looks like a class act." Mayank Shekhar from Hindustan Times gave it 1 star out of five and stated that "This is pornography for the hormonally demented teen. Or maybe this is erotica."

Music

Anu Malik composed the on-camera songs for the film. Alexander von Bubenheim composed the original score. The soundtrack consists of six original recordings, composed by Anu Malik, David Kushner, Panjabi MC, Alexander Von Bubenheim, Salim–Sulaiman and Julian Lennon, and lyrics penned by Sameer, Shruti Haasan, Mallika Sherawat, Shweta Pandit, Shraddha Pandit and Sayeed Quadri. The soundtrack also featured hit songs from the films Robot and De Dana Dan. Mallika Sherawat makes her musical debut on the soundtrack alongside Julian Lennon. Shruti Haasan sings and appears in a promotional video with music by Dave Kushner. The music supervisor for the film, Marcus Barone, co-produced the soundtrack album for Split Image Soundtracks with Venus Records and Tapes with co-producer of the film William Keenan. Official Bollywood Soundtrack Charts charted "I Got That Poison" performed by Panjabi MC and Shweta Pandit at No. 8 from 24 October 2010 to 5 November 2010.

References

External links
 
 

2010 films
Films directed by Jennifer Chambers Lynch
2010s Hindi-language films
American independent films
Films about snakes
Indian independent films
Films scored by Anu Malik
Films featuring songs by Pritam
Films about shapeshifting
2010s English-language films
2010s American films